Kai Böcking (born 3 August 1964) is a German television presenter.

Life 
Böcking works as television presenter on German television.

Television 
 1989–1992 Rias TV
 1988–1990: 
 1991–1992: Kai Life, WDR
 1993: Heiter bis ulkig, Dritte Programme
 1994: Dollar, WDR, HR, MDR
 1995: Die Ersten, Das Erste
 1995: Holidate, ZDF
 1996: Fernsehgarten
 1996–1999: Jetzt kannst Du was erleben, ZDF
 1998–2002: Risiko!
 Auge um Auge, ZDF
 NRW Champion, WDR
 2003: Die Deutsche Stimme 2003, ZDF
 2004–2005: Best of Formel Eins, kabel eins
 2007: Kochstars – Die Herausforderer, tv.gusto
 2008: Deutschland kocht!, tv.gusto
 TV Total Turmspringen

References

External links 
 

1964 births
ARD (broadcaster) people
German television presenters
Living people
ZDF people